Jeffrey Franklin East (born October 27, 1957) is an American actor. Beginning his professional acting career at the age of fourteen, East is known for his portrayal of Huckleberry Finn in the United Artists feature films Tom Sawyer (1973) and Huckleberry Finn (1974), as well as for his portrayal of a teenage Clark Kent in Richard Donner's Superman: The Movie (1978).

Early life
East was born in Kansas City, Missouri, to parents Ira and Joan Ann East.  His father worked in real estate and his mother was a homemaker.  East grew up with three siblings; an older sister named Anne, an older brother named Ronald, and a twin sister named Jane.

Career
East's feature film credits include The Flight of the Grey Wolf (1974), Stranger in Our House (1978), Mary and Joseph: A Story of Faith (1979), Klondike Fever (1980), Deadly Blessing (1981), Up the Creek (1984), Dream West (1986), Pumpkinhead (1988), Another Chance (1989), and Deadly Exposure (1993).

Unbeknownst to East when the film was being made, his Superman dialogue was dubbed over by Christopher Reeve.

East also starred in the 1983 television film The Day After. His TV guest appearances include M*A*S*H ("Settling Debts"), Otherworld, and Shades of L.A.

Personal life
In 1987, East became involved in real estate development with his father.  In February 2004, he moved back to Kansas City to take over his father's commercial real estate company.

Jeff's first marriage was to Lori Gates. Though the marriage ended in divorce the couple had two children, Alexander Gates East (1984) and Madison Gates East (1987).

In 2014, East married for the third time, to Pascale Lambert East, and moved to Nice, France.

Filmography

Film

Television

References

External links

 
 Jeff East Interview, November 2004

1957 births
American male child actors
American male film actors
American male television actors
Living people
Male actors from St. Louis